William Hearn (born 13 May 1850 in Paisley, Scotland) was a champion professional sculler of New Zealand, who emigrated to Victoria at a young age. He came to New Zealand in 1862, and had been a resident in Wellington since January 1876, nearly all the time having been employed by Messrs Greenfield and Stewart, timber merchants.

Achievements

 1867, at Hokitika Regatta, won All-comers Sculling Race, £20. 
 1869, at Hokitika, won All-comers Sculling Race, £20; also stroked winning crew in Four-oared Race. 
 1870, at Hokitika Regatta, won All-comers Sculling Race, £20. 
 1871, at Greymouth Regatta, won All-comers Sculling Race, £20, and stroked winning crew Four-oared Race; at Hokitika Regatta 
 1872, at Greymouth Regatta, won All-comers Sculling Race, £20; Hokitika, won All-comers Sculling Race, £20. 
 1873, at Greymouth Regatta, won All-comers Sculling Race £12. 
 1874, at Kaiapoi Regatta, won Champion Sculls, beating three others, and rowed No. 2 in winning crew for Four-oared Champion Race of £150. 
 1875, at Greymouth Regatta, rowed second to Jackson in All-comers Sculling Race, for £20. 
 1876, at Wellington Regatta, won Champion Sculls, rowed No. 2 in Dolly Varden crew, and won Champion Out-rigged Fours, £150, and In-rigged Fours £100. 
 1877, at Nelson Regatta, rowed in winning crew for Champion Outrigged Fours, £150; Inrigged Fours, £75 and cup; and Out-rigged Pairs.  
 1877, at Wellington Regatta, won Champion Sculls; also in crews for Out-rigged Fours, In-rigged Pairs, and In-rigged Fours. 
 1878, at Wanganui Regatta, won Sculling Race, Four-oared In-rigged Race, and Four- oared In-rigged Race, for Ladies' Plate. 
 1878, at Wellington Regatta, rowed in Dolly Varden crew, winning Champion Four-oared Outrigger Race, Inrigged Fours, and Champion Sculls. 
 1879, rowed and defeated Wing, of Melbourne, in a match for £25 a side.  
 1879, at Wellington Regatta, won Champion Sculls; rowed bow, and won In-rigged Fours; same year was defeated by Charles A. Messenger over a two-mile course on the Yarra. 
 1880, at Wellington Regatta, won Champion Sculls;  
 1880, at Wanganui Regatta, won Sculling Race. 
 1881, in July, rowed and defeated Albert White in Port Nicholson Harbour for Championship of New Zealand and £100 a side. 
 1882, beat Messenger over the same course for Championship and £100 a-side.  
 1885, at Riverton, rowed Harrington for Championship and £100 a-side, winning easily. 
 1887, won All-comers Sculling Race, Riverton ; Palamountain, 2 ; Beere, 3 ; Harrington, 4 ; Macleay, 5., 
 1888, took part in Handicap Out-rigger Sculling Race at Grafton Regatta, Clarence River, New South Wales, the handicap being as follows : — Ned Hanlan, scratch; Neilson, 3.5 lengths; Hearn, 4.5 lengths; Henry Ernest Searle, 7.5 lengths. Result— Searle, 1; Neilson, 2; Hearn, 3. Hanlan did not start. On 3 January 1888, at same regatta, rowed in Skiff Race (handicap). Hearn, carrying top weight (301bs), finished third, the feather weight winning. There was a field of eight.   
 1888, rowed in Centennial Regatta for Championship of Australia, the result being- Peter Kemp, 1 ; Hearn, 2 ; Neilson, 3.

Out of 43 events mentioned Hearn was victorious in 38, and defeated in only five. Such a successful career has fallen to the lot of very few scullers, either professional or amateur. His last match was on 5 February 1890 when he raced Charles Stephenson for the Championship of New Zealand. The stake was £100 a side and Stephenson won.

Hearn was set to compete in January 1907 against champion sculler Jim Stanbury but the race does not appear to have happened.

See also
New Zealand Sculling Championship

References

 Marlborough Express (newspaper) 4 February 1890.

1850 births
Year of death missing
New Zealand male rowers
Sportspeople from Paisley, Renfrewshire
Scottish emigrants to New Zealand